Václav Korunka (born December 25, 1965, in Jilemnice) is a former Czech cross-country skier who raced from 1988 to 1999. He earned a bronze medal in the 4 × 10 km relay at the 1988 Winter Olympics in Calgary while his best individual Winter Olympics finish was a 13th in the 50 km event in 1992.

Korunka also won a bronze medal in the 4 × 10 km relay at the 1989 FIS Nordic World Ski Championships. His best individual finish at the World Championships was an eight in the 15 km event in those same championships.

Korunka won three FIS races in his career as well.

Cross-country skiing results
All results are sourced from the International Ski Federation (FIS).

Olympic Games
 1 medal – (1 bronze)

World Championships
 1 medal – (1 bronze)

World Cup

Season standings

Individual podiums
 3 podiums

Team podiums
 3 podiums – (3 ) 
{| class="wikitable sortable" style="font-size:95%; text-align:center; border:grey solid 1px; border-collapse:collapse; background:#ffffff;"
|- style="background:#efefef;"
! style="background-color:#369; color:white;"| No.
! style="background-color:#369; color:white;"| Season
! style="background-color:#4180be; color:white; width:120px;"| Date
! style="background-color:#4180be; color:white; width:170px;"| Location
! style="background-color:#4180be; color:white; width:170px;"| Race
! style="background-color:#4180be; color:white; width:130px;"| Level
! style="background-color:#4180be; color:white;| Place
! style="background-color:#4180be; color:white;"| Teammates
|-
| align=center|1 || rowspan=1 align=center|1987–88||  4 February 1988 || align=left|   Calgary, Canada ||  4 × 10 km Relay F || Olympic Games ||3rd || Nyč / Benc / Švanda
|-
| align=center|2 || rowspan=1 align=center|1988–89|| 24 February 1989 || align=left|   Lahti, Finland || 4 × 10 km Relay C/F || World Championships  ||3rd || Švanda / Petrásek / Nyč
|-
| align=center|3|| rowspan=1 align=center|1989–90||11 March 1990 || align=left|   Örnsköldsvik, Sweden  || 4 × 10 km Relay C/F || World Cup || 3rd ||Švanda / Buchta / Nyč
|}Note:'''  Until the 1999 World Championships and the 1994 Winter Olympics, World Championship and Olympic races were included in the World Cup scoring system.

References

External links
 
  

1965 births
Cross-country skiers at the 1988 Winter Olympics
Cross-country skiers at the 1992 Winter Olympics
Cross-country skiers at the 1994 Winter Olympics
Czech male cross-country skiers
Czechoslovak male cross-country skiers
Living people
Olympic bronze medalists for Czechoslovakia
Olympic cross-country skiers of Czechoslovakia
Olympic cross-country skiers of the Czech Republic
Olympic medalists in cross-country skiing
FIS Nordic World Ski Championships medalists in cross-country skiing
Medalists at the 1988 Winter Olympics
People from Jilemnice
Sportspeople from the Liberec Region